The Marcia Reale d'Ordinanza ("Royal March of Ordinance") or Fanfara Reale ("Royal Fanfare") was the official national anthem of the Kingdom of Italy between 1861 and 1946. It was composed in 1831 by Giuseppe Gabetti to the order of Charles Albert of Sardinia as the hymn of the royal House of Savoy, along with the Sardinian national anthem. It remained a famous, recognizable and cherished symbol of Italy throughout the history of the Monarchy. 

In September 1943 the future king of Italy Umberto II chose the patriotic song La Leggenda del Piave as the new national anthem replacing the Marcia Reale. It remained the official anthem of Italy until June 1944, when Rome was liberated and the government and the King returned to the capital, the Marcia Reale was in fact reintroduced as a national anthem and remained both after the appointment of Crown Prince Umberto of Savoy as Lieutenant General of the Realm and after his ascension to Kingship. After the 1946 Italian institutional referendum, the newly established Italian Republic selected "Il Canto degli Italiani" in its stead as National Anthem.

Lyrics (unofficial)

See also
 Il Canto degli Italiani - the current National Anthem of Italy in use since 1947.
 Giovinezza - the Fascist anthem sung after the "Marcia Reale" between 1924 and 1943.

Italian anthems
Historical national anthems
Royal anthems
National symbols of Italy
1831 songs
Italian military marches